Anhimella contrahens is a species of cutworm or dart moth in the family Noctuidae. It is found in North America.

The MONA or Hodges number for Anhimella contrahens is 10530.

Subspecies
These two subspecies belong to the species Anhimella contrahens:
 Anhimella contrahens conar Strecker, 1898
 Anhimella contrahens contrahens

References

Further reading

 
 
 

Eriopygini
Articles created by Qbugbot
Moths described in 1860